Archana Airways was a regional airline based in New Delhi, India. It operated domestic scheduled services with a fleet of turboprop aircraft from 1994 to 2000.

History

Archana Airways Limited was founded on 29 April 1991 and started its full service operation in 1993 with three brand new Czech built L-410 UVP-E9, 17 seater commuter aircraft. In 1994  the company was granted scheduled airlines status by the Government of India through Directorate General of Civil Aviation, New Delhi.

Seeing the quality of service provided by Archana Airways, in 1994, it was approached by MPAVN (now MPSIDC) to connect some sectors in the state of Madhya Pradesh and also subscribe equity of the company as co-promoter.

Archana was among the smallest of the 30 old aviation companies which had come into being by 1994. The airline quickly set up in-house facilities, for overhaul of aircraft and training programs for pilots, cabin attendants, traffic assistants and security staff.

Archana was operating its schedule flight to Kullu, Shimla, Jaipur, Udaipur and Jodhpur sector.

In the beginning of 1995, to connect more sectors, the company planned an expansion to acquire bigger capacity aircraft. The plan was to acquire two new DASH-8 Aircraft on deferred credit basis.

The company was having three L410 (17 Seater) aircraft out of which two aircraft met with an accidents in Kanpur ('96) and Kullu ('96). The company acquired three new Let L-410 aircraft during 96–97. The promoters started feeling credit crunch and were unable to pay the instalments of the aircraft. The company incurred heavy losses due to low load factors and high cost of operation. In 2000, it went out of business.

Destinations
As of October 1994, Archana Airways served the following cities:

India

Chandigarh
 Chandigarh Airport
Chhattisgarh
Raipur – Raipur Airport
Delhi
Indira Gandhi International Airport Hub
Himachal Pradesh
Dharamshala – Gaggal Airport
Kullu – Kullu Airport
Shimla – Shimla Airport
Madhya Pradesh
Bhopal – Raja Bhoj Airport
Jabalpur – Jabalpur Airport
Punjab
Ludhiana – Ludhiana Airport

Incidents and accidents
 An Archana Airways Let L 410 crashed after taking off from Shimla while operating on the Delhi-Shimla-Bhunter-Delhi sector on the morning of 11 July 1996, killing all 9 persons aboard (including three flight crew members).

Fleet
Archana Airways operated the Bombardier Dash 8 aircraft. It formerly operated Let L-410 aircraft.

Current status
Archana Airways Limited has been taken over by Ascent Pinnacle Capital Limited

References

Defunct airlines of India
Airlines established in 1991
Airlines disestablished in 2000
Companies based in New Delhi
Indian companies established in 1991
Indian companies disestablished in 2000
1991 establishments in Delhi